The history of Belgium extends before the founding of the modern state of that name in 1830, and is intertwined with those of its neighbors: the Netherlands, Germany, France and Luxembourg. For most of its history, what is now Belgium was either a part of a larger territory, such as the Carolingian Empire, or divided into a number of smaller states, prominent among them being the Duchy of Brabant, the County of Flanders, the Prince-Bishopric of Liège, the County of Namur, the County of Hainaut and the County of Luxembourg. Due to its strategic location as a country of contact between different cultures, Belgium has been called the "crossroads of Europe"; for the many armies fighting on its soil, it has also been called the "battlefield of Europe" or the "cockpit of Europe". It is also remarkable as a European nation which contains, and is divided by, a language boundary between Latin-derived French and Germanic Dutch.

Belgium's modern shape can be traced back at least as far as the southern core of the medieval Burgundian Netherlands. These lands straddled the ancient boundary of the Scheldt that had divided medieval France and Germany, but they were brought together under the House of Valois-Burgundy, and unified into one autonomous territory by their heir Charles V, Holy Roman Emperor, in his Pragmatic Sanction of 1549. The Eighty Years' War (1568–1648) later led to the split between a northern Dutch Republic and the Southern Netherlands from which Belgium and Luxembourg developed. This southern territory continued to be ruled by the Habsburg descendants of the Burgundian house, at first as the Spanish Netherlands. Invasions from France under Louis XIV led to the loss of what is now Nord-Pas-de-Calais to France.

The area, long a Habsburg stronghold, briefly came under Bourbon control during the War of the Spanish Succession.  The resulting Peace of Utrecht transferred the area back to Habsburg control, creating what is now known as the Austrian Netherlands. The French Revolutionary wars led to Belgium becoming part of France in 1795, bringing the end of the semi-independence of areas which had belonged to the Catholic church. After the defeat of the French in 1814, the Congress of Vienna created two new states, the United Kingdom of the Netherlands and the Grand Duchy of Luxembourg, both of which were placed in dynastic union under the House of Orange-Nassau.

The Southern Netherlands rebelled during the 1830 Belgian Revolution, establishing the modern Belgian state, official recognized at the London Conference of 1830.  The first King of Belgium, Leopold I, assumed the throne in 1831.  Leopold became known domestically for bringing a swift end to the Belgian theater in the Revolutions of 1848, and internationally as pacifying force in European politics, mediating disputes between great powers and maintaining Belgian neutrality.

Belgium's second king, Leopold II, became a controversial figure when he established a colony in south-central Africa, the Congo Free State, as his own personal fief.  When the atrocities of his rule became public, he was stripped of control of the colony by the Belgian government, establishing the Belgian Congo.  Domestically, Leopold presided over a state known for growing liberal sentiments, with the growth of the labour movement and the establishment of universal male suffrage.

The first half of the twentieth century was much more tumultuous for Belgium.  Its historic neutrality was violated twice in each of the World Wars, as Germany used the relatively open terrain of Belgium to bypass French defenses.  Belgian resistance to the German invaders resulted in the Rape of Belgium during World War I.  The surrender by Leopold III of Belgium to German forces shortly after the 1940 invasion of the country served to drive a wedge between the King and his people, and would forever damage his legacy.  After the war he remained in exile while a regent, Prince Charles, Count of Flanders, ruled in his stead.  His attempt to return to the country and re-exert personal control of the country led to a constitutional crisis in 1950, which led to his abdication in favor of his son Baudouin.

Baudouin took a less active role in politics than his predecessors, and Belgium entered the second half of the twentieth century showing an unprecedented era of economic growth, as Belgium took an active role in the formation of the Benelux customs union with its neighbors, the Netherlands and Luxembourg.  The union allowed the states to resist American political and economic influence during the period of the Marshall Plan, and allowed the region to plot its own economic path.  Ultimately, the Benelux union would serve as a model for the European Economic Community, a precursor to the European Union; to this day Brussels serves as the seat of many of the European Union institutions.  Other major events during Baudouins reign included the independence of the Belgian Congo leading to the Congo Crisis, the conflicts between the Christian Social Party and its more left-leaning opponents over school funding, and the growth of the Flemish Movement.

Domestically, the country has faced divisions over differences of language and unequal economic development. This ongoing antagonism has caused far-reaching reforms since the 1970s, changing the formerly unitary Belgian state into a federal state, and repeated governmental crises. It is now divided into three regions: Flanders  (Dutch-speaking) in the north, Wallonia (French-speaking) in the south, and bilingual Brussels in the middle.

Since the 1990s, Belgium has become involved in several international conflicts, under the aegis of various United Nations peacekeeping forces, including the Rwandan Civil War, the ongoing civil wars in Somalia, the Kosovo War, and several others.  Environmental concerns came to a head in the Dioxin affair, bringing down the Belgian government of Jean-Luc Dehaene's premiership.  Since then, the Belgian political landscape has become increasingly politically fragmented; the notorious 2010 Belgian federal election, it took nearly a year to form a government, in more recent elections a growing right-wing Flemish nationalist movement has had a strong influence over domestic politics.

Names
Belgium is an old name which had various meaning, but a key turning point when it was used specifically to refer to the southern part of the Netherlands was during the so-called "Brabant revolution" or "First Belgian Revolution" in 1790, during a short period of independence from Austrian rule, only a few years before the invasion of France. This terminology was revived after the better known revolution of 1830, when modern Belgium broke out of the post-Waterloo kingdom of the Netherlands.

Belgium and Flanders were the first two common names used for the Burgundian Netherlands which was the predecessor of the Austrian Netherlands, the predecessor of Belgium. It is originally a Latin term used by Julius Caesar. The term continued to be used occasionally in different ways until the creation of the modern country. While Caesar described the Belgian part of Gaul as a larger area, much bigger than modern Belgium, including large parts of modern France, Germany and the Netherlands, he only used the term "Belgium" once, referring to a smaller area now mostly in Northern France, where the tribes ruling the Belgian military alliance lived. Under Roman rule this region was the equivalent of the province of Belgica Secunda, which stretched into the coastal Flemish part of modern Belgium.

In late Roman and medieval times the term Belgium tended to be used to refer to Roman Belgica Prima, and its successor Upper Lotharingia, in the Moselle region of Germany, Luxembourg and France. Only slowly in modern times did the old term start to be used for the area to the north of the two Roman Belgica provinces, now the Netherlands and Belgium. For example, it was sometimes used as a classical name for the northern "United Provinces", roughly the predecessor of the modern Netherlands, after they separated from the Spanish-ruled south, roughly the predecessor of modern Belgium, in the early modern era.

Prehistory

On Belgian territory Neanderthal fossils were discovered at Engis in 1829–30 and elsewhere, some dating back to at least 100,000 BC.

The earliest Neolithic farming technology of northern Europe, the so-called LBK culture, reached the east of Belgium at its furthest northwesterly stretch from its origins in southeast Europe. Its expansion stopped in the Hesbaye region of eastern Belgium around 5000 BC. The Belgian LBK is notable for its use of defensive walls around villages, something which may or may not have been necessary because of the proximity of hunter gatherers.

So-called "Limburg pottery" and "La Hoguette pottery" are styles which stretch into northwestern France and the Netherlands, but it has sometimes been argued that these technologies are the result of pottery technology spreading beyond the original LBK farming population of eastern Belgium and northeastern France, and being made by hunter gatherers. A slightly later-starting Neolithic culture found in central Wallonia is the so-called "Groupe de Blicquy", which may represent an offshoot of the LBK settlers. One notable archaeological site in this region is the Neolithic flint mines of Spiennes.

Farming in Belgium however failed to take permanent hold at first. The LBK and Blicquy cultures disappeared and there is a long gap before a new farming culture, the Michelsberg culture, appeared and became widespread. Hunter gatherers of the Swifterbant culture apparently remained in the sandy north of Belgium, but apparently became more and more influenced by farming and pottery technology.

In the third and late fourth millennia BC, the whole of Flanders shows relatively little evidence of human habitation. Although it is felt that there was a continuing human presence, the types of evidence available make judgement about the details very difficult. The Seine-Oise-Marne culture spread into the Ardennes, and is associated with megalithic sites there (for example Wéris), but did not disperse over all of Belgium. To the north and east, in the Netherlands, a semi-sedentary culture group has been proposed to have existed, the so-called Vlaardingen-Wartburg-Stein complex, which possibly developed from the above-mentioned Swifterbant and Michelsburg cultures. The same pattern continues into the late Neolithic and early Bronze Age. In the last part of the Neolithic, evidence is found for the Corded Ware and Bell Beaker cultures in the south of the Netherlands, but these cultures also do not seem to have had a big impact in all of Belgium.

The population of Belgium started to increase permanently with the late Bronze Age from around 1750 BC. Three possibly related European cultures arrived in sequence. First the Urnfield culture arrived (for example, tumuli are found at Ravels and Hamont-Achel in the Campine). Then, coming into the Iron Age, the Hallstatt culture, and the La Tène culture. All three of these are associated with Indo-European languages, with specifically Celtic languages being especially associated with La Tène material culture, and possibly Halstatt. This is because historical Greek and Roman records from areas where this culture settled show Celtic placenames and personal names.

However it is possible in Belgium that especially in the northern areas the Hallstatt and La Tène cultures were brought by new elites, and that the main language of the population was not Celtic. From 500 BC Celtic tribes settled in the region and traded with the Mediterranean world. From c. 150 BC, the first coins came into use, under the influence of trade with the Mediterranean.

Celtic and Roman periods

When Julius Caesar arrived in the region, as recorded in his De Bello Gallico, the inhabitants of Belgium, northwestern France, and the German Rhineland were known as the Belgae (after whom modern Belgium is named), and they were considered to be the northern part of Gaul. The region of Luxembourg, including the part of the Belgian province of Luxembourg around Arlon, was inhabited by the Treveri, who were not listed by Caesar as Belgae, although the Romans later placed them in the province of the Belgae.

The exact nature of the distinction between the Belgae to the North and the Celts to the south, and the Germani across the Rhine, is disputed. Caesar said that the Belgae were separated from the rest of Gaul by language, law and custom, and he also says they had Germanic ancestry, but he does not go into detail. It seems clear that Celtic culture and language were very influential upon the Belgae, especially those in modern France. On the other hand, linguists have proposed that there is evidence that the northern part of the Belgic population had previously spoken an Indo European language related to, but distinct from, Celtic and Germanic, and among the northern Belgae, Celtic may never have been the language of the majority. (See Belgian language and Nordwestblock.)

The leaders of the Belgic alliance which Caesar confronted were in modern France, the Suessiones, Viromandui and Ambiani and perhaps some of their neighbours, in an area that he appears to distinguish as the true "Belgium" of classical times. Concerning the territory of modern Belgium, he reported that the more northerly allies of the Belgae, from west to east the Menapii, Nervii, and Germani cisrhenani, were less economically developed and more warlike, similar to the Germani east of the Rhine river. The Menapii and northern Germani lived among low thorny forests, islands and swamps, and the central Belgian Nervii lands were deliberately planted with thick hedges, in order to be impenetrable to cavalry. There is also less archaeological evidence of large settlements and trade in the area. According to Tacitus, writing a generation later, the Germani cisrhenani (who included the Eburones) were in fact the original tribe to be called Germani, and all other uses of the term extended from them, though in his time the same people were now called the Tungri. Tacitus also reported that both the Treveri and Nervii claimed Germanic and Belgic kinship.

Modern linguists use the word "germanic" to refer to languages but it is not known for sure whether even the Belgian Germani spoke a Germanic language, and their tribal and personal names are clearly Celtic. This is in fact also true of the possibly related tribes across the Rhine from them at this time. Archaeologists have also had difficulty finding evidence of the exact migrations from east of the Rhine which Caesar reports and more generally there has been skepticism about using him in this way due to the political motives of his commentaries. But the archaeological record gives the impression that the classical Belgian Germani were a relatively stable population going back to Urnfield times, with a more recently immigrated elite class who would have been of more interest to Caesar.

The Menapii and Nervii flourished within the Roman province of Gallia Belgica, along with the southern Belgae and the Treveri. These Roman provinces were broken into civitates, each with a capital city, and each representing one of the major tribal groups named by Caesar. At first, only one, Tongeren capital of the Tungri, was in modern Belgium. Later, the capital of the Menapii was moved from Cassel in modern France to Tournai in Belgium. The Nervian capital was in the south of the territory in modern France, at Bavay, and later moved to Cambrai. Trier, the capital of the Treveri, is today in Germany, near Luxembourg.

The northeastern corner of this province, including Tongeren and the area of the earlier Germani, was united with the militarized Rhine border to form a newer province known as Germania Inferior. Its cities included Ulpia Noviomagus (Nijmegen in the modern Netherlands), Colonia Ulpia Trajana (Xanten in modern Germany) and the capital Colonia Agrippina (Cologne in Germany). Later, Emperor Diocletian restructured the provinces around 300, and split the remaining Belgica into two provinces: Belgica Prima and Belgica Secunda. Belgica Prima was the eastern part and had Trier as its main city, and included part of the Belgian province of Luxembourg. It became one of the most important Roman cities in Western Europe in the 3rd century.

Christianity was also first introduced to Belgium during the late-Roman period, and the first known bishop in the region Servatius taught in the middle of the Fourth century in Tongeren.

Early Middle Ages

In the Middle Ages, the old Roman civitates became the basis of Christian dioceses, and the row of dioceses which form the core of modern Belgium (Tournai, Cambrai, and Liège) were the most northerly continental areas to retain a Romanized culture. The modern Belgian language boundary derives from this period, as the area was a contact point of Frankish and Romanized populations.

As the Western Roman Empire lost power, Germanic tribes came to dominate the military, and then form kingdoms. Coastal Flanders, the old territory of the Menapii, became part of the "Saxon Shore". In inland northern Belgium, Franks from the Roman frontier in the Rhine delta were allowed to re-settle in Toxandria in the 4th century. Wallonia, which has several regions of arable land such as the Hesbaye and Condroz, remained more heavily Romanized, although it eventually became subject to Franks in the 5th century. Franks remained important in the Roman military, and the Romanized Frankish Merovingian Dynasty eventually took over northern France. Clovis I, the best-known king of this dynasty, first conquered Romanized northern France, later called Neustria, then turned north to the Frankish lands later referred to as Austrasia, which included all or most of Belgium. He converted to Catholicism, followed by many followers. Christian missionaries preached to the populace and started a wave of conversion (Saint Servatius, Saint Remacle, Saint Hadelin).

The Merovingian dynasty was succeeded by the Carolingian dynasty, whose family power base was in and around the eastern part of modern Belgium. After Charles Martel countered the Moorish invasion from Spain (732 — Poitiers), King Charlemagne (born close to Liège in Herstal or Jupille) brought a huge part of Europe under his rule and was crowned the "Emperor of the new Holy Roman Empire" by the Pope Leo III (800 in Aachen).

The Vikings raided widely throughout this period, but a major settlement that had caused problems in the area of Belgium was defeated in 891 by Arnulf of Carinthia in the battle of Leuven.

The Frankish lands were divided and reunified several times under the Merovingian and Carolingian dynasties, but eventually were firmly divided into France and the Holy Roman Empire. The parts of the County of Flanders stretching out west of the river Scheldt (Schelde in Dutch, Escaut in French) became part of France during the Middle Ages, but the remainders of the County of Flanders and the Low Countries were part of the Holy Roman Empire, specifically they were in the stem duchy of Lower Lotharingia, which had a period as an independent kingdom.

Through the early Middle Ages, the northern part of present-day Belgium (now commonly referred to as Flanders) was a Germanic language-speaking area, whereas in the southern part people had continued to be Romanized and spoke derivatives of Vulgar Latin.

As the Holy Roman Emperors and French Kings lost effective control of their domains in the 11th and 12th centuries, the territory more or less corresponding to the present Belgium was divided into relatively independent feudal states, including:
The County of Flanders
The Marquisate of Namur
The Duchy of Brabant (see also Duke of Brabant)
The County of Hainaut
The Duchy of Limburg
The County of Luxembourg
The Prince-Bishopric of Liège (the territory over which the bishop ruled as a lord, which was smaller than the diocese)

The coastal county of Flanders was one of the wealthiest parts of Europe in the late Middle Ages, from trading with England, France and Germany, and it became culturally important. During the 11th and 12th centuries, the Rheno-Mosan or Mosan art movement flourished in the region moving its centre from Cologne and Trier to Liège, Maastricht and Aachen. Some masterpieces of this Romanesque art are the shrine of the Three Kings at Cologne Cathedral; the baptismal font at St Bartholomew's Church, Liège by Renier de Huy; the Stavelot Triptych; the shrine of Saint Remacle in Stavelot; the shrine of Saint Servatius in Maastricht; and Notger's gospel in Liège.

Late Middle Ages and Renaissance

In this period, many cities, including Ypres, Bruges and Ghent, obtained their city charter. The Hanseatic League stimulated trade in the region, and the period saw the erection of many Gothic cathedrals and city halls. With the decline of the Holy Roman emperors' power starting in the 13th century, the Low Countries were largely left to their own devices. The lack of imperial protection also meant that the French and English began vying for influence in the region.

In 1214, King Philip II of France defeated the Count of Flanders in the Battle of Bouvines and forced his submission to the French crown. Through the remainder of the 13th century, French control over Flanders steadily increased until 1302 when an attempt at total annexation by Philip IV met a stunning defeat when Count Guy (who had the support of the guilds and craftsmen) rallied the townspeople and humiliated the French knights at the Battle of the Golden Spurs. Undaunted, Philip launched a new campaign that ended with the inconclusive Battle of Mons-en-Pévèle in 1304. The king imposed harsh peace terms on Flanders, which included ceding the important textile-making centers of Lille and Douai.

Thereafter, Flanders remained a French tributary until the start of the Hundred Years' War in 1337. In Brabant, skillful work by the duke of that territory and the Count of Hainaut-Holland foiled various French manipulations. Paris's influence in the Low Countries was counterbalanced by England, which maintained important ties to the coastal ports.

Flanders faced the difficult situation of being politically subservient to France, but also reliant on trade with England. Many craftsmen emigrated to England, which also came to dominate the wool-shipping business. Flemish cloth nonetheless remained a highly valued product, and it was highly dependent on English wool. Any interruption in the supply of that invariably resulted in riots and violence from the weavers' guilds. On the whole though, Flemish trade became a passive one. Flanders received imports from other areas of Europe, but itself purchased little abroad except wine from Spain and France. Bruges became a great commercial center after the Hanseatic League set up business there and the Italian banking houses followed suit.

A few towns in the Low Countries dated back to Roman times, but most had been founded from the 9th century onward. The oldest were in the Scheldt and Meuse areas, with many towns in what's now the Netherlands being much younger and only dating from the 13th century. From early on, the Low Countries began to develop as a commercial and manufacturing center. Merchants became the dominant class in the towns, with the nobility largely limited to countryside estates.

By 1433 most of the Belgian and Luxembourgish territory along with much of the rest of the Low Countries became part of Burgundy under Philip the Good. When Mary of Burgundy, granddaughter of Philip the Good married Maximilian I, the Low Countries became Habsburg territory. Their son, Philip I of Castile (Philip the Handsome) was the father of Charles V. The Holy Roman Empire was unified with Spain under the Habsburg Dynasty after Charles V inherited several domains.

Especially during the Burgundy period (the 15th and 16th centuries), Tournai, Bruges, Ypres, Ghent, Brussels, and Antwerp took turns at being major European centers for commerce, industry (especially textiles) and art. Bruges was the pioneer. It had a strategic location at the crossroads of the northern Hanseatic League trade and the southern trade routes. Bruges was already included in the circuit of the Flemish and French cloth fairs at the beginning of the 13th century, but when the old system of fairs broke down the entrepreneurs of Bruges innovated. They developed, or borrowed from Italy, new forms of merchant capitalism, whereby several merchants would share the risks and profits and pool their knowledge of markets.  They employed new forms of economic exchange, including bills of exchange (i.e. promissory notes) and letters of credit.  Antwerp eagerly welcomed foreign traders, most notably the Portuguese pepper and spice traders.

In art the Renaissance was represented by the Flemish Primitives, a group of painters active primarily in the Southern Netherlands in the 15th and early 16th centuries (for example, Johannes Van Eyck and Rogier Van der Weyden), and the Franco-Flemish composers (e.g. Guillaume Dufay). Flemish tapestries and, in the 16th and 17th centuries, Brussels tapestry hung on the walls of castles throughout Europe.

The Pragmatic Sanction of 1549, issued by Roman Emperor Charles V, established the so-called Seventeen Provinces, or Belgica Regia in its official Latin term, as an entity on its own, apart from the Empire and from France. This comprised all of Belgium, present-day north-western France, present-day Luxembourg, and present-day Netherlands, except for the lands of the Prince-Bishop of Liège.

The Burgundian princes from Philip II (the Bold) to Charles the Bold enhanced their political prestige with economic growth and artistic splendour. These "Great Dukes of the West" were effectively sovereigns, with domains extending from the Zuiderzee to the Somme. The urban and other textile industries, which had developed in the Belgian territories since the 12th century, became the economic center of northwestern Europe.

The death of Charles the Bold (1477) and the marriage of his daughter Mary to the archduke Maximilian of Austria ended the independence of the Low Countries by bringing them increasingly under the sway of the Habsburg dynasty. Mary and Maximilian's grandson Charles became king of Spain as Charles I in 1516 and Holy Roman emperor as Charles V in 1519.

In Brussels on 25 October 1555, Charles V abdicated Belgica Regia to his son, who in January 1556 assumed the throne of Spain as Philip II.

Dutch Revolt and 80 years war

The northern part of Belgica Regia, comprising seven provinces and eventually forming the Dutch Republic, became increasingly Protestant (specifically, Calvinist), while the larger part, called 't Hof van Brabant and comprising the ten southern provinces, remained primarily Catholic. This schism, and other cultural differences which had been present since ancient times, launched the Union of Atrecht in the Belgian regions, later followed by the Union of Utrecht in the northern regions. When Philip II, son of Charles V, ascended the Spanish throne he tried to abolish all Protestantism. Portions of Belgica Regia revolted, eventually resulting in the Eighty Years' War (1568–1648) between Spain and the Dutch Republic. The horrors of this war—massacres, religious violence, mutinies—were precursors to the Thirty Years' War (1618–1648) with which it would merge.

After the Iconoclastic Fury of 1566, Spanish authorities were able to largely gain control of the Low Countries. The most notable event of this period was the Battle of Oosterweel, in which Spanish forces destroyed an army of Dutch Calvinists. King Philip II sent in Fernando Álvarez de Toledo, 3rd Duke of Alba, as Governor-General of the Spanish Netherlands from 1567 to 1573. Alba established a special court called the Council of Troubles (nicknamed the "Council of Blood"). The Blood Council's reign of terror saw it condemn thousands of people to death without due process and drive the nobles into exile while seizing their property. Alba boasted that he had burned or executed 18,600 persons in the Netherlands, in addition to the far greater number he massacred during the war, many of them women and children; 8,000 persons were burned or hanged in one year, and the total number of Alba's Flemish victims can not have fallen short of 50,000.

The Dutch Revolt spread to the south in the mid-1570s after the Army of Flanders mutinied for lack of pay and went on the rampage in several cities. At the Battle of Gembloux, on January 31, 1578, the Dutch, who were retiring from Namur, were followed by Don Juan of Austria, who sent forward a picked force of 1,600 men, under Gonzaga and Mondragón in pursuit; they attacked the rearguard, under Philip Egmont, and dispersed it, and then, falling suddenly upon the main body, utterly routed it, killing at least 10,000 rebels. The Spaniards lost 10 or 11 at most. Don Juan of Austria died on October 1, 1578, and was succeeded by Alexander Farnese, Duke of Parma.

With the arrival of large numbers of troops from Spain, Farnese began a campaign of reconquest in the south. He took advantage of the divisions in the ranks of his opponents between the Dutch-speaking Flemish and the Walloon-speaking south to foment growing discord. By doing so he was able to bring back the Walloon provinces to an allegiance to the king. By the treaty of Arras in 1579, he secured the support of the "Malcontents", as the Catholic nobles of the south were styled. The seven northern provinces, controlled by Calvinists, responded with the Union of Utrecht, where they resolved to stick together to fight Spain. Farnese secured his base in Hainaut and Artois, then moved against Brabant and Flanders. He captured many rebel towns in the south: Maastricht (1579), Tournai (1581), Oudenaarde (1582), Dunkirk (1583), Bruges (1584), and Ghent (1584). On August 17, 1585, Farnese laid siege to the great seaport of Antwerp.

Antwerp was one of the richest cities in northern Europe and a rebel stronghold ever since Spanish and Walloon troops sacked it in 1576. The city was open to the sea, strongly fortified, and well defended under the leadership of Marnix van St. Aldegonde. Engineer Sebastian Baroccio cut off all access to the sea by constructing a bridge of boats across the Scheldt. The Dutch sailed fireships, called Hellburners, against the bridge and one of the exploding infernal machines blew up a 200-foot-long span and killed 800 Spaniards. The besiegers repaired the damage, however, and pressed the investment. The city surrendered in 1585 as 60,000 Antwerp citizens (60% of the pre-siege population) fled north. Brussels, Mechelen and Geertruidenberg fell the same year.

In a war composed mostly of sieges rather than battles, Farnese proved his mettle. His strategy was to offer generous terms for surrender: there would be no massacres or looting; historic urban privileges were retained; there was a full pardon and amnesty; return to the Catholic Church would be gradual. Meanwhile, Catholic refugees from the North regrouped in Cologne and Douai and developed a more militant, tridentine identity. They became the mobilising forces of a popular Counter-Reformation in the South, thereby facilitating the eventual emergence of the state of Belgium.

In 1601, the Spanish besieged Ostend. The three-year-long siege produced more than 100,000 casualties before Ostend finally fell to the Spanish in 1604. While the former northern part of Belgica Regia, the Seven United Provinces, gained independence, Southern Belgica Regia remained under the rule of Spain (1556–1713). The southern part spoke various romance languages and the northern part used Dutch, yet court accounts were kept in Spanish.

17th and 18th centuries

During the 17th century, Antwerp continued to be blockaded by the Dutch but became a major European center for industry and art. The Brueghels, Peter Paul Rubens and Van Dyck's baroque paintings were created during this period.

Wars between France and the Dutch Republic
After the Franco-Spanish War (1635–1659), Spain shifted most of its troops out of Belgium to Iberia, where they engaged a failed effort to reconquer Portugal. From 1659, Madrid increasingly relied on the aid of allied armies to restrain French ambitions to annex the Spanish Netherlands, in which Spain showed declining interest after more than a century of war.

Under Louis XIV (1643–1715), France pursued an expansionist policy, particularly affecting Belgium. France frequently held control of territories in the Southern Netherlands, confronted by various opponents including the Netherlands and Austria. There was the War of Devolution (1667–1668), the Franco-Dutch War (1672–1678), the War of the Reunions (1683–1684), and the Nine Years' War (1688–1697). These were then followed by the War of the Spanish Succession (1701–1714).

When Charles II of Spain died in 1700, two dynasties of foreign relatives contested for the throne, the House of Bourbon, who ruled France, and the Habsburgs, who were emperors of the Holy Roman Empire as well as holding various territories in central Europe. The Austrian Habsburgs were supported by an alliance led by Britain, the Dutch Republic, and several other northern European Protestant states, and the French were supported by Bavaria. Much of the war occurred on Belgian soil, with the allies there being led upon the field by John Churchill, the Duke of Marlborough.

After the victory of Austria and its allies, under the 1714 Treaty of Rastatt, the Belgian and present-day Luxembourg territories (except the lands under the lordship of the Prince-Bishop of Liège) were transferred to the Austrian Habsburgs, thus forming the Austrian Netherlands (1714–1797), while the Bourbon Dynasty succeeded in inheriting Spain itself.

Brabant Revolution
The First Belgian Revolution of 1789–90 (also known as the Brabant revolution) overlapped with the French Revolution, which began in 1789. The movement called for independence from Austrian rule. Brabant rebels, under the command of Jean-André van der Mersch, defeated the Austrians at the Battle of Turnhout and launched the United States of Belgium together with the Prince Bishopric of Liège. The new state was beset by factionalism between the radical "Vonckists", led by Jan Frans Vonck and the more conservative "Statists" of the Henri Van der Noot. Businessmen with widescale operations generally supported the Statists, while the Vonckists attracted small business and members of the trade guilds. They called for independence from Austria but were conservative in social and religious questions. By November 1790, the revolt had been crushed and the Habsburg monarchy had returned to power.

French control

Following the Campaigns of 1794 of the French Revolutionary Wars, Belgium Austriacum was invaded and annexed by France in 1795, ending Habsburg rule.

Southern Netherlands and the territory of Liège was divided into nine united départements and became an integral part of France. The Prince-Bishopric of Liège was dissolved. Its territory was divided over the départements Meuse-Inférieure and Ourte. The Holy Roman Emperor confirmed the loss of Southern Netherlands,  by the Treaty of Campo Formio, in 1797.

The French invaded and controlled Belgium, 1794–1814, imposing all their new reforms and incorporating what had been the "Austrian Netherlands" and the Prince-Bishopric of Liege into France. New rulers were sent in by Paris. Belgian men were drafted into the French wars and heavily taxed. Nearly everyone was Catholic, but the Church was repressed. Resistance was strong in every sector, as Belgian nationalism emerged to oppose French rule. The French legal system, however, was adopted, with its equal legal rights, and abolition of class distinctions. Belgium now had a government bureaucracy selected by merit, but it was not at all popular.

Until the establishment of the Consulate in 1799, Catholics were heavily repressed by the French. The first University of Leuven was closed in 1797 and churches were plundered. During this early period of the French rule, the Belgian economy was completely paralyzed as taxes had to be paid in gold and silver coin while goods bought by the French were paid for with worthless assignats. During this period of systematic exploitation, about 800,000 Belgians fled the Southern Netherlands. The French occupation in Belgium led to further suppression of the Dutch language across the country, including its abolition as an administrative language.  With the motto "one nation, one language", French became the only accepted language in public life as well as in economic, political, and social affairs.

The measures of the successive French governments and in particular the 1798 massive conscription into the French army were unpopular everywhere, especially in Flemish regions, where it sparked the Peasants' War. The brutal suppression of the Peasants' War marks the starting point of the modern Flemish movement.

In 1814, the Allies drove out Napoleon and ended French rule. The plan was to join Belgium and the Netherlands, under Dutch control. However Napoleon returned to power briefly during the Hundred Days in 1815, but on his way to recapturing Brussels as his intended power base from which to recapture France, was finally defeated at the Battle of Waterloo, 12 miles (19 km) south of that city.

Economics
France promoted commerce and capitalism, paving the way for the ascent of the bourgeoisie and the rapid growth of manufacturing and mining.  In economics, therefore, the nobility declined while the middle class Belgian entrepreneurs flourished because of their inclusion in a large market, paving the way for Belgium's leadership role after 1815 in the Industrial Revolution on the Continent.

Godechot finds that after the annexation, Belgium's business community supported the new regime, unlike the peasants, who remained hostile. Annexation opened new markets in France for wool and other goods from Belgium. Bankers and merchants helped finance and supply the French army. France ended the prohibition against seaborne trade on the Scheldt that had been enforced by the Netherlands. Antwerp quickly became a major French port with a world trade, and Brussels grew as well.

United Kingdom of the Netherlands

After Napoleon's defeat at Waterloo in 1815, the major victorious powers (Britain, Austria, Prussia, and Russia) agreed at the Congress of Vienna on uniting the former Austrian Netherlands (Belgium Austriacum) and the former Seven United Provinces, creating the United Kingdom of the Netherlands, which was to serve as a buffer state against any future French invasions. This was under the rule of a Protestant king, William I. Most of the small and ecclesiastical states in the Holy Roman Empire were given to larger states at this time, and this included the Prince-Bishopric of Liège which now became formally part of the United Kingdom of the Netherlands.

The enlightened despot William I, who reigned from 1815 to 1840, had almost unlimited constitutional power, the constitution having been written by a number of notable people chosen by him. As despot, he had no difficulty in accepting some of the changes resulting from the social transformation of the previous 25 years, including equality of all before the law. However, he resurrected the estates as a political class and elevated a large number of people to the nobility. Voting rights were still limited, and only the nobility were eligible for seats in the upper house.

William I was a Calvinist and intolerant of the Roman Catholic majority in the southern parts of his newly created kingdom. He promulgated the "Fundamental Law of Holland", with some modifications. This entirely overthrew the old order of things in the southern Netherlands, suppressed the clergy as an order, abolished the privileges of the Roman Catholic Church, and guaranteed equal protection to every religious creed and the enjoyment of the same civil and political rights to every subject of the king. It reflected the spirit of the French Revolution and in so doing did not please the bishops in the south, who had detested the Revolution.

William I actively promoted economic modernization. His position as monarch was ambivalent, however; his sovereignty was real, but his authority was shared with a legislature partly chosen by himself and partly elected by the more prosperous citizens, under the constitution granted by the king. Government was in the hands of national ministries of state, and the old provinces were reestablished in name only. The government was now fundamentally unitary, and all authority flowed from the center. The first fifteen years of the Kingdom showed progress and prosperity, as industrialization proceeded rapidly in the south, where the Industrial Revolution allowed entrepreneurs and labor to combine in a new textile industry, powered by local coal mines. There was little industry in the northern provinces, but most of the former Dutch overseas colonies were restored, and highly profitable trade resumed after a 25-year hiatus. Economic liberalism combined with moderate monarchical authoritarianism to accelerate the adaptation of the Netherlands to the new conditions of the 19th century. The country prospered, until a crisis arose in its relations with the southern provinces.

Unrest in the southern provinces 
Protestants controlled the new country, although they formed only a quarter of the population. In theory, Roman Catholics had full legal equality; in practice their voice was not heard. Few held high state or military offices. The king insisted that schools in the South end their traditional teaching of Roman Catholic doctrine, even though almost everyone there was of that faith. Socially, the French-speaking Walloons strongly resented the king's policy to make Dutch the language of government. There was also growing outrage at the king's insensitivity to social differences. According to Schama, there was growing hostility to the Dutch government, whose "initiatives were met at first with curiosity, then with apprehension and finally with fierce and unyielding hostility".

Political liberals in the south had their own grievances, especially regarding the king's authoritarian style; he seemed uncaring about the issue of regionalism, flatly vetoing a proposal for a French-language teacher-training college in francophone Liège.  Finally, all factions in the South complained of unfair representation in the national legislature. The south was industrializing faster and was more prosperous than the north, leading to resentment of northern arrogance and political domination.

The outbreak of revolution in France in 1830 was used as a signal for revolt. The demand at first was Home Rule for "Belgium", as the southern provinces were now being called, rather than separation. Eventually, revolutionaries began demanding total independence.

Belgian revolution

The Belgian Revolution broke out in August 1830 when crowds, stirred by a performance of Auber's La Muette de Portici at the Brussels opera house of La Monnaie, spilled out onto the streets singing patriotic songs. Violent street fighting soon broke out, and anarchy reigned in Brussels.  The liberal bourgeoisie, who had initially been at the forefront of the burgeoning revolution, were appalled by the violence and became willing to accept a compromise with the Dutch.

The revolution broke out for numerous reasons. On a political level, the Belgians felt significantly under-represented in the Netherlands' elected Lower Assembly and disliked the unpopular Prince of Orange, the future William II who was the representative of King William I in Brussels. Partisans watched with excitement the unfolding of the July Revolution in France, details of which were swiftly reported in the newspapers. The French-speaking Walloons also felt ostracised in a majority Dutch speaking country. There were also significant religious grievances felt by the majority Catholic Belgians in a nation controlled by the Dutch Protestants.

The king assumed the protest would blow over. He waited for a surrender, announcing an amnesty for all revolutionaries, except foreigners and the leaders. When this did not succeed he sent in the army. Dutch forces were able to penetrate the Schaerbeek Gate into Brussels, but the advance was stalled in the Parc de Bruxelles under a hail of sniper fire. Royal troops elsewhere met determined resistance from revolutionaries at makeshift barricades. It is estimated that there were no more than 1,700 revolutionaries (described by the French Ambassador as an "undisciplined rabble") in Brussels at the time, faced with over 6,000 Dutch troops.  However, faced with strong opposition, Dutch troops were ordered out of the capital on the night of 26 September after three days of street fighting. There were also battles around the country as revolutionaries clashed with Dutch forces. In Antwerp, eight Dutch warships bombarded the city following its capture by revolutionary forces.

Belgian independence was not allowed by the 1815 Congress of Vienna; nevertheless the revolutionaries were regarded sympathetically by the major powers of Europe, especially the British and France. In November 1830, the London Conference of 1830 or "Belgian Congress" (comprising delegates from Great Britain, France, Russia, Prussia and Austria) ordered an armistice on November 4. At the end of November Britain and France came up with a proposal — no military intervention and the establishment of an independent kingdom of Belgium — which was accepted by the other three more conservative participants, who had favored a military intervention to restore the absolutist regime of William I. A protocol signed on 20 January 1831 stated that Belgium would be formed of the regions that did not belong to the North in 1790. The new kingdom would be obliged to remain neutral in foreign affairs. The British foreign secretary Lord Palmerston strongly backed the Prince of Orange as the new king, a choice which would have maintained a dynastic link between the Netherlands and the new kingdom. The Prince proved to be unacceptable to William I, his father, as well as to the French, who wanted a clear break with the Netherlands. Finally, Palmerston came up with his second choice, Leopold I of Saxe-Coburg — Princess Charlotte of Wales' widower, and an admirer of the British constitutional model — who was accepted by all. On July 21, 1831, the first "King of the Belgians" was inaugurated. The date of his acceptance of the constitution – 21 July 1831 – is marked a national holiday.

The liberal bourgeoisie, who had been thrown off balance by the early stages of the revolution, hastily formed a provisional government under Charles Rogier to negotiate with the Dutch, officially declaring Belgian independence on 4 October 1830. The Belgian National Congress was formed to draw up a constitution. Under the new constitution, Belgium became a sovereign, independent state with a constitutional monarchy. However, the constitution did severely limit voting rights to the French-speaking haute-bourgeoisie and the clergy, in a country where French was not the majority language. The Catholic church was afforded a good deal of freedom from state intervention.

The state of conflict (but not open warfare) with the Netherlands lasted another eight years, but in 1839, the Treaty of London was signed between the two countries and the five great powers of Europe (Austria, France, Prussia, Russia, and the United Kingdom). By the treaty of 1839, the eastern part of Luxembourg did not join Belgium, but remained a possession of the Netherlands until different inheritance laws caused it to separate as an independent Grand Duchy (the western, French-speaking part of Luxembourg became the Belgian province of that name). Belgium lost Eastern Limburg, Zeelandic Flanders, French Flanders and Eupen: four territories which it had claimed on historical grounds. The Netherlands retained the former two while French Flanders, which had been annexed at the time of Louis XIV, remained in French possession. Eupen remained within the German Confederation. The five great powers pledged to protect Belgium's neutrality in the future. In 1914, the violation of Belgium's neutrality would be the stated Casus belli of Britain's entry into World War I.

Independence to World War I

The Industrial Revolution

Most of society was highly traditional, especially in the small villages and rural areas and the quality of education was low. Few people expected that Belgium – seemingly a "sluggish" and "culturally dormant" bastion of traditionalism – would leap to the forefront of the industrial revolution on the Continent. Nevertheless, Belgium was the second country, after Britain, in which the industrial revolution took place. It developed into an open economy focused on industrial exports with strong ties between the banking sector and the basic industry.
Belgium set the pace for all of continental Europe, while leaving the Netherlands behind.

Industrialization took place in Wallonia (French-speaking southern Belgium), starting in the middle of the 1820s, and especially after 1830. The availability of cheap coal was a main factor that attracted entrepreneurs. Numerous works comprising coke blast furnaces as well as puddling and rolling mills were built in the coal mining areas around Liège and Charleroi. The leader was a transplanted Englishman John Cockerill. His factories at Seraing integrated all stages of production, from engineering to the supply of raw materials, as early as 1825.

Industry spread through the Sillon industriel ("industrial district"), Haine, Sambre and Meuse valleys.  By 1830 when iron became important the Belgian coal industry had been long-established, and used steam engines for pumping. Coal was sold to local mills and railways as well as to France and Prussia.

The textile industry, based on cotton and flax, employed about half of the industrial workforce for much of the industrial period. Ghent was the premier industrial city in Belgium until the 1880s, when the center of growth moved to Liège, with its steel industry.

Wallonia had rich coalfields over much of its area, and the highly folded nature of coal seams meant that it could be found at relatively shallow depths. Deep mines were not required at first so there were a large number of small operations. There was a complex legal system for concessions, often multiple layers had different owners. Entrepreneurs started going deeper and deeper (thanks to the innovation of steam pumping). In 1790, the maximum depth of mines was 220 meters. By 1856, the average depth in the area west of Mons was 361, and in 1866, 437 meters and some pits had reached down 700 and 900 meters; one was 1,065 meters deep, probably the deepest coal mine in Europe at this time. Gas explosions were a serious problem, and Belgium had high fatality rates. By the late 19th century the seams were becoming exhausted and the steel industry was importing some coal from the Ruhr.

Cheap and readily available coal attracted firms producing metals and glass, both of which required considerable amounts of coal, and so regions around coal fields became highly industrialised. The Sillon industriel (Industrial Valley), and in particular the Pays Noir around Charleroi, were the centre of the steel industry until the Second World War.

Railways

The nation provided an ideal model for showing the value of the railways for speeding the Industrial Revolution. After 1830, the new nation decided to stimulate industry. It funded a simple cross-shaped system that connected the major cities, ports and mining areas, and linked to neighboring countries. Belgium thus became the railway center of the region. The system was very soundly built along British lines, so that profits and wages were low but the infrastructure necessary for rapid industrial growth was put in place. Léopold I went on to build the first railway in continental Europe in 1835, between Brussels and Mechelen. The first trains were drawn by Stephenson engines imported from Great Britain. The development of smaller railways in Belgium, notably the Liège–Jemappes line, was launched by tendering contracts to private companies which "became the model for the extension of small local railways all over the low countries."

By the 1900s, Belgium was a major exporter of trams and other rail components, exporting vast quantities of railway materials. In South America, 3,800 kilometers of track were owned by Belgian firms, with a further 1,500 kilometers in China. One Belgian entrepreneur, Édouard Empain, known as the "Tramway King," built many public transport systems across the world, including the Paris Métro, as well as the tram systems in Cairo, Boulogne and Astrakhan. Empain's firm also built the new Cairo suburb of Heliopolis.

Other important businesses included Cockerill-Sambre (steel), the chemical factories of Ernest Solvay, and the firearms maker Fabrique Nationale de Herstal.

Liberalism and Catholicism
See also Liberalism in Belgium and First School War

Politics, says Clark, "was dominated by a struggle between two political groups, known as the Catholics and the Liberals. In general terms, the Catholics represented the relatively religious, conservative and rural elements in the society, while the Liberals represented the more secular, more progressive and more urban middle-class elements."  Before the arrival of the socialists in the 1890s, the nation was therefore polarised between the conservative Catholic Party and the secular Liberal Party. The Liberals were anticlerical and wanted to reduce the power of the Church. The conflict came to a head during the "First School War" of 1879–1884 as Liberal attempts to introduce a greater level of secularism in primary education were beaten back by outraged Catholics. The School War ushered in a period of Catholic Party dominance in Belgian politics that lasted (almost unbroken) until 1917.

Religious conflict also extended to university education, where secular universities like the Free University of Brussels competed with Catholic universities like the Catholic University of Leuven.

Linguistic conflict
The majority of those in the north of the country spoke Dutch and other Low Franconian languages while those in the south spoke Langues d'oïl such as French, Walloon and Picard. French became the official language of government after the separation from the Netherlands in 1830 and Belgian cultural life was especially dominated by the French influence, reinforced by economic domination of the industrial south. Flemish was "reduced to the tongue of a second-class culture." Parts of the Flemish population reacted against this, agitating for the equality of their language with French. This was partly due to a sense of growing Flemish identity, made possible through greater awareness of Flemish culture and history from the 1840s. Flemish victories, like the Battle of the Golden Spurs in 1302 were celebrated and a Flemish cultural movement, led by figures like Hendrik Conscience was born.  About the same time a Walloon Movement emerged, led by Jules Destrée (1863–1936) and based on loyalty to the French language. Universal suffrage meant the Francophones were a political minority, so the Walloon Movement concentrated on protecting French where it had a majority, and did not contest the expanded use of Dutch in Flemish areas.

The Flemish goal of linguistic equality (especially in schools and courts) was finally achieved by a series of laws in the 1920s and 1930s. Dutch became the language of government, education, and the courts in the northern provinces of East Flanders and West Flanders, Antwerp, Limburg, and eastern Brabant. French remained the official language in Wallonia; Brussels, which had seen a major language shift to French, became an officially bilingual region.  Meanwhile, a small separatist Flemish movement had emerged; the Germans had supported it during the war, and in the 1930s it turned fascist. In the Second World War it collaborated with the Nazis.

Foreign relations and military policy

See also Belgium and the Franco-Prussian War
In the mid-1860s during the "Mexican Adventure", around 1,500 Belgian soldiers joined the "Belgian Expeditionary Corps," better known as the "Belgian Legion" to fight for Emperor Maximilian I, whose wife, Charlotte was the daughter of Leopold I of Belgium.

Belgium was not a belligerent in the Franco-Prussian War 1870–71, but the proximity of the war led to the mobilisation of the army.  The 1839 international guarantee of Belgian neutrality was not violated.

After the conflict, there was talk of modernising the military. The system of Remplacement (whereby wealthy Belgians conscripted into the military could pay for a "replacement") was abolished and an improved system of conscription implemented. These reforms, led by d'Anethan under pressure from Leopold II, divided Belgian politics. The Catholics united with the Liberals under Frère-Orban to oppose them, and the reforms were finally defeated when d'Anethan's government fell during an unrelated scandal.  Eventually, the military was reformed. The 1909 System instituted compulsory military service of eight years on active duty and five years in the reserves.  This swelled the size of the Belgian army to over 100,000 well-trained men. Construction of a chain of forts along the border was intensified, and let to a series of very modern fortifications, including the so-called "National redoubt" at Antwerp, at the fortified positions of Liège and Namur, many of them designed by the great Belgian fortress architect, Henri Alexis Brialmont.

Rise of the Socialist Party and the trade unions
See also Belgian Labour Party and Belgian general strikes

The economy was stagnant during the long depression of 1873–95, as prices and wages fell and labour unrest grew. The Belgian Workers' Party was founded in 1885 in Brussels. It issued the Charter of Quaregnon in 1894 calling for an end to capitalism and a thorough reorganization of society. Though, the Belgian Workers' Party was not elected to government until the late 20th century, it exerted considerable pressure on the rest of the political process, both through direct participation in politics themselves, but also through general strikes.

During the late 19th century, general strikes became an established aspect of the political process. Between 1892 and 1961, there were 20 major strikes, including 7 general strikes. Many of these had overtly political motives, like the 1893 General Strike that helped achieve universal suffrage.

On several occasions, Belgian general strikes escalated into violence. In 1893, soldiers fired on the striking crowd, killing several. Karl Marx wrote, "There exists but one country in the civilised world where every strike is eagerly and joyously turned into a pretext for the official massacre of the Working Class. That country of single blessedness is Belgium!"

Nevertheless, Belgium created a welfare net particularly early, thanks in part to the trade unions. Sickness compensation was established in 1894, voluntary old-age insurance in 1900 and unemployment insurance in 1907, achieving good coverage nationwide much more quickly than its neighbours.

Voting rights

See also Belgian general strike of 1893
In 1893 the government rejected a proposal for universal male suffrage. Outraged, the Belgian Labour Party called a General Strike; by April 17, there were more than 50,000 strikers. Violent confrontations broke out with the Garde Civique (the Civil Guard or militia) around the country, as in Mons, where several strikers were killed. Violence escalated. The government soon backed down, and passed male universal suffrage but reduced its impact by creating plural votes based on wealth, education and age. The Catholic conservatives, with 68% of the seats, remained in power, as the Liberals dropped to only 13% of the seats and the Socialists held their share.

Again in 1902 and 1913 there were general strikes aimed at forcing electoral reform and ending the system of plural voting.  After the 1913 strike a commission was created and was expected to remove plural voting – but implementation was delayed by the 1914 German invasion of Belgium. In 1918, King Albert forged a post-war "Government of National Union" and brought about one man, one vote universal male suffrage. The last restrictions on women's voting were only lifted in 1948.

Culture
Artistic and literary culture in Belgium began a revival towards the late 19th century. Particularly, among Walloons with the new French language literary and artistic review La Jeune Belgique.

A core element of Belgian nationalism was the scientific study of its national history. The movement was led by Godefroid Kurth (1847–1916), a student of the German historian Ranke. Kurth taught modern historical methods to his students at the University of Liège. The most prominent Belgian historian was Henri Pirenne (1862–1935), who was influenced by this method during his period as a student of Kurth.

Architecture and Art Nouveau

See also Art Nouveau

At the end of the 19th century and at the beginning of the 20th century, monumental Historicism and Neoclassicism dominated the urban Belgian landscape, particularly in government buildings, between the 1860s and 1890s. Championed in part by King Leopold II (known as the "Builder King"), the style can be seen in the Palais de Justice (designed by Joseph Poelaert) and the Cinquantenaire, both of which survive in Brussels.

Nevertheless, Brussels became one of the major European cities for the development of the Art Nouveau style in the late 1890s. The architects Victor Horta, Paul Hankar, and Henry van de Velde became particularly famous for their designs, many of which survive today in Brussels. Four buildings designed by Horta are listed by UNESCO World Heritage Sites. Horta's largest work, the Maison du Peuple was demolished in 1960.

Empire

Stanard rejects the widely held notion that Belgians were "reluctant imperialists."  He argues that "ordinary people came to understand and support the colony. Belgians not only sustained the empire in significant ways, but many became convinced imperialists, evidenced by the widespread, enduring and eagerly embraced propaganda in favor of the Congo."

Congo Free State and Belgian Congo

King Leopold II of Belgium had been the principal shareholder in the Belgian trading company which established trading stations on the lower Congo between 1879 and 1884. At the Berlin Conference of 1884–1885 the future Congo was personally assigned to Leopold, who named the territory the Congo Free State. It was originally intended to be an international Free Trade zone, open to all European traders. The area included in this territory was just under 1 million square miles, almost 80 times the size of Belgium. The first infrastructure projects took place during the Free State period, such as a railway that ran from the Léopoldville to the coast which took several years to complete.

The era of the Congo Free State is most infamous for the large number of atrocities committed under it. Since it was, in effect, a business venture, run by a private company headed by Leopold himself, it aimed to gain as much money as possible from primary exports from the territory. Leopold's personal fortune was greatly increased through the proceeds of selling Congolese rubber, which had never previously been mass-produced in such surplus quantities, to the growing market for tyres. During the period between 1885 and 1908, as many as eight million Congolese died of exploitation and disease while the birth rate dropped.  However, these are only rough estimates, as no figures are available for the period.

To enforce the rubber quotas, the Force Publique (FP) was created. While the Force Publique was nominally a military force – it would later fight during both the First and Second World Wars) -during the Congo Free State period its primary duties involved enforcing rubber quotas in rural areas. If a village did not meet the rubber quota which had been set, soldiers were often sent to the respective village, and numerous measures could be adopted to enforce the taxes: rape, abduction, forced labor, executions. Imprisonment and summary executions were common. Severing of limbs was sometimes used by the Force Publique as a method of enforcing the quotas. A Belgian captain, Leon Rom, had ornamented his flowerbeds with the heads of 21 decapitated natives which had been murdered in a punitive expedition.

Following reports from missionaries, there was growing moral outrage, particularly in Britain and the United States. The Congo Reform Association, led by Edmund Dene Morel, was particularly important in this campaign, and published numerous best-selling tracts and pamphlets (including Red Rubber) which reached a vast public. King Leopold appointed and financed his own commission to put these accusations to rest, but it too confirmed the atrocities.

The Belgian parliament long refused to take over the colony, which was considered a financial burden. In 1908, the Belgian parliament responded to the international pressure, annexing the Free State, as the campaigners had argued for. After World War II, Belgium was criticized by the United Nations for making no progress on the political front. Despite propaganda campaigns within Belgium, few Belgians showed much interest in the colony; very few went there, and imperial enthusiasm was never widespread. Also, the government limited the possibility of Congolese settling inside Belgium.

Political rights were not granted to the Africans until 1956 when the growing middle class (the so-called Évolué) received the franchise, and the economy remained relatively undeveloped despite the mineral wealth of Katanga. At the Round Table Talks on independence, Belgium requested a process of gradual independence over 4 years, but following a series of riots in 1959, the decision was made to bring forward independence in matter of months. The chaos in which Belgium departed the Congo caused the secession of rich Western-backed province Katanga and the prolonged civil war known as the Congo Crisis.

China 1902–31
The Belgian Tianjin Concession in China was established in 1902. There was little investment and no settlement. However it led to a contract to supply an electric light and trolley system. In 1906, Tianjin became the first city in China with a modern public transportation system. The supply of electricity and lighting and the trolley business were profitable ventures. All the rolling stock was supplied by Belgian industries and by 1914, the network also reached nearby Austrian, French, Italian, Japanese and Russian concessions.

Ruanda-Urundi 1917–61
After the defeat of Germany in World War I, Belgium inherited League of Nations mandates over Ruanda-Urundi.

The colony was administered in a similar way as by the former German administrators, continuing policies such as ethnic identity cards. In 1959, moves towards independence could be seen in the territory and agitation by PARMEHUTU, a Hutu political party, was evident. In 1960, the Rwandan Revolution occurred and Belgium changed the appointments of chiefs and vice-chiefs to promote Hutus into the posts.

Ruanda-Urundi gained independence in 1962 and its two regions, Rwanda and Burundi, separated.

World War I

When World War I began, Germany invaded neutral Belgium and Luxembourg as part of the Schlieffen Plan, trying to take Paris quickly. The threat to France caused Britain to enter the war; it used the 1839 agreement as justification.  The Belgian army is remembered for their stubborn resistance during the early days of the war, with the army – around a tenth the size of the Germany Army – holding up the German offensive for nearly a month, giving the French and British forces time to prepare for the Marne counteroffensive later in the year. The German invaders treated any resistance—such as sabotaging rail lines—as illegal and subversive, and shot the offenders and burned buildings in retaliation.

Belgium had a prosperous economy in 1914 at the start of the war but after four years of occupation, it emerged in a poor state; although Belgium itself had suffered few deaths. The Germans had "brutally and efficiently stripped the country bare. Machinery, spare parts, whole factories including the roofs, had disappeared eastward. In 1919, 80 percent of its workforce was unemployed."

Military role
See also Battle of the Yser
Belgian soldiers fought delaying actions in 1914 during the initial invasion.  They succeeded in throwing the elaborate German invasion plan off schedule and helped sabotage the Schlieffen Plan that Berlin had counted on for a quick victory over France,  At the Battle of Liège, the town's fortifications were able to hold off the invaders for over a week, buying valuable time for the Allies. The German "Race to the Sea" was held off by Belgian forces at the Battle of the Yser. King Albert I stayed in the Yser as commander of the military to lead the army while Broqueville's government withdrew to nearby Le Havre in France.
Belgian units continued to serve on the front until 1918.

Forces from the Belgian Congo also played a major role in the African Campaign and a small unit of Belgian soldiers also served on the Eastern Front.

Occupation 1914–18

See also Rape of Belgium
The Germans governed the occupied areas of Belgium through a General Governorate of Belgium, while a small area of the country remained unoccupied by the Germans.

The whole country was ruled under martial law. On the advice of the government, civil servants remained in their posts for the duration of the conflict, carrying out the day-to-day functions of government.

The German army executed between 5,500 and 6,500 French and Belgian civilians between August and November 1914, usually in near-random large-scale shootings of civilians ordered by junior German officers.  Individuals suspected of partisan activities were summarily shot. Several important Belgian figures, including politician Adolphe Max and historian Henri Pirenne were deported to Germany.

Flemish feeling of identity and consciousness grew through the events and experiences of war. The German occupying authorities viewed the Flemish as an oppressed people and had taken several Flemish-friendly measures, known as Flamenpolitik. This included introducing Dutch as the language of instruction of all state-supported schools in Flanders in 1918. This prompted a renewed Flemish movement in the years following the war. The Flemish Frontbeweging (Soldiers' Movement) was formed from Flemish soldiers in the Belgian army to campaign for greater use of Dutch language in education and government, though not separatist.

The Germans left Belgium stripped and barren.  Over a 1.4 million refugees fled to France or to neutral Netherlands.  After the systematic atrocities by the German army in the first few weeks of the war, German civil servants took control and were generally correct, albeit strict and severe.  There was never a violent resistance movement, but there was a large-scale spontaneous passive resistance of refusal to work for the benefit of German victory. Belgium was heavily industrialized; while farms operated and small shops stayed open most large establishments shut down or drastically reduced their output. The faculty closed the universities; many publishers shut down their newspapers. Most Belgians "turned the four war years into a long and extremely dull vacation," says Kossmann.  In 1916 Germany shipped 120,000 men and boys to work in Germany; this set off a storm of protest from neutral countries and they were returned. Germany then stripped the factories of all useful machinery, and used the rest as scrap iron for its steel mills.

International relief
Belgium faced a food crisis and an international response was organized by the American engineer Herbert Hoover.  It was unprecedented in world history. Hoover's Commission for Relief in Belgium (CRB) had the permission of Germany and the Allies. As chairman of the CRB, Hoover worked with the leader of the Belgian Comité National de Secours et d'Alimentation (CNSA), Émile Francqui, to feed the entire nation for the duration of the war. The CRB obtained and imported millions of tons of foodstuffs for the CN to distribute, and watched over the CN to make sure the German army did not appropriate the food. The CRB became a veritable independent republic of relief, with its own flag, navy, factories, mills, and railroads. Private donations and government grants (78%) supplied an $11-million-a-month budget.

At its peak, the American arm, the ARA fed 10.5 million people daily. Great Britain grew reluctant to support the CRB, preferring instead to emphasize Germany's obligation to supply the relief; Winston Churchill led a military faction that considered the Belgian relief effort "a positive military disaster."

Interwar period

King Albert returned as a war hero, leading the victorious army and acclaimed by the population. In contrast, the government and the exiles came back discreetly. Belgium had been devastated—not so much by combat, but rather by German seizure of valuable machinery. Only 81 operable locomotives remained, out of the 3,470 available in 1914. 46 of 51 steel mills were damaged, with 26 destroyed totally.

Waves of popular violence accompanied liberation in November and December 1918 and the government responded through the judicial punishment of collaboration with the enemy conducted between 1919 and 1921. Shop windows were broken and houses sacked, men were harassed, and women's heads were shaved. Manufacturers who had closed their businesses sought the severe repression of those who had pursued their activities. Journalists who had boycotted and stopped writing called for harsh treatment of the newspapers that submitted to German censorship. Many people stigmatized profiteers and demanded justice. Thus in 1918, Belgium was already confronted with the problems associated with occupation that most European countries only discovered at the end of World War II.

However, despite the status quo, Belgium recovered surprisingly quickly. The first postwar Olympic Games were held in Antwerp in 1920. In 1921, Luxembourg formed a customs union with Belgium.

Reparations
German reparations to Belgium for damage incurred during the First World War was set at £12.5 billion pounds sterling.
In 1919 under the Treaty of Versailles the area of Eupen-Malmedy, along with Moresnet was transferred to Belgium. "Neutral Moresnet" was transferred to Belgium, as well as the Vennbahn railway. An opportunity was given to the population to "oppose" against the transfer by signing a petition, which gathered few signatures, in large part thanks to intimidation by local authorities, and all regions remain part of Belgium today.

Belgian requests to annex territory considered as historically theirs, from the Dutch, who were perceived as collaborators, was denied.

Between 1923 and 1926, Belgian and French soldiers were sent to the Ruhr in Germany to force the German government to agree to continue reparation payments. The Occupation of the Ruhr led the Dawes Plan which allowed the German government more leniency in paying reparations.

The League of Nations in 1925 made Belgium the trustee for the former German East Africa which bordered the Belgian Congo to the east. It became Rwanda-Urundi (or "Ruanda-Urundi") (modern day Rwanda and Burundi). Although promising the League it would promote education, Belgium left the task to subsidised Catholic missions and unsubsidised Protestant missions. As late as 1962, when independence arrived, fewer than 100 natives had gone beyond secondary school. The policy was one of low-cost paternalism, as explained by Belgium's special representative to the Trusteeship Council: "The real work is to change the African in his essence, to transform his soul, [and] to do that one must love him and enjoy having daily contact with him. He must be cured of his thoughtlessness, he must accustom himself to living in society, he must overcome his inertia."

Art and culture

The Expressionism painting movement found a distinctive form in Flanders under artists like James Ensor, Constant Permeke and Léon Spilliaert.

Belgian Surrealist art grew during the inter-war period. René Magritte's first surrealist painting, The Lost Jockey, appeared in 1926. Paul Delvaux was also an extremely influential painter in this genre.

Comic strips became extremely popular in Belgium during the 1930s. One of the most popular comics of the 20th century, Hergé's The Adventures of Tintin first appeared in 1929. The growth of comic strips was also accompanied by a popular art movement, exemplified by Edgar P. Jacobs, Jijé, Willy Vandersteen and André Franquin.

World War II

Belgium tried to pursue a policy of unaligned neutrality before the war, but on May 10, 1940 the country was invaded by German forces. In the initial attacks, the fortifications which had been constructed to protect the borders like Fort Eben-Emael and the K-W Line were captured or bypassed by German forces. On May 28, after 18 days of fighting, Belgian forces (including the commander in chief, King Leopold III) surrendered. The elected government of Belgium, under Hubert Pierlot, escaped to form a government in exile.

Belgian Army in the United Kingdom

See also Free Belgian Forces

After the defeat in 1940, significant numbers of Belgian soldiers and civilians managed to escape to Britain to join the Belgian army in Exile.

Belgian soldiers formed the 1st Belgian Infantry Brigade, which also included a battery of soldiers from Luxembourg, more often known as the Brigade Piron after its commanding officer, Jean-Baptiste Piron. The Brigade Piron was involved in the Normandy Invasion and the battles in France and the Netherlands until liberation. Belgians also served in British special forces units during the war, forming a troop of No.10 Commando which was heavily involved in the Italian Campaign and Landings on Walcheren. The 5th Special Air Service (SAS) was entirely made up of Belgians.

Two Belgian squadrons, amounting to over 400 pilots, served in the Royal Air Force during the war, both 349 and 350 Squadrons, which claimed over 50 'kills'.

Two Corvettes and a group of Minesweepers were also operated by the Belgians during the Battle of the Atlantic, comprising some 350 men in 1943

A significant contribution was made by the Belgian Congo. Congolese soldiers of the Force Publique were involved in fighting with Italian forces during the East African Campaign. Congolese soldiers also served in the Middle East and Burma. The Congo was also a vitally important economic asset to the allied powers, particularly through its exports of rubber and uranium; in fact the uranium used during the Manhattan Project – including that used for the atomic bombs dropped on Hiroshima and Nagasaki was supplied by the Belgian firm Union Minière du Haut Katanga from Katanga Province in the Belgian Congo.

Occupation 1940–44

See also Belgium in World War II, Military Government and The Holocaust in Belgium
Belgium was run by a Germany military government between its surrender and liberation in September 1944.

The former fort at Breendonk, near Mechelen was requisitioned by the Nazis and used for detainment and interrogation of Jews, political prisoners and captured members of the resistance. Of the 3,500 incarcerated in Breendonk between 1940 and 1944, 1,733 died. About 300 people were killed in the camp itself, with at least 98 of them dying from deprivation or torture.

In 1940, nearly 70,000 Jews were living in Belgium. Of these, 46 percent were deported from the Mechelen transit camp, while a further 5,034 people were deported via the Drancy internment camp (close to Paris). From the summer of 1942 until 1944, twenty-eight transports left Belgium carrying 25,257 Jews and 351 Roma to eastern Europe. Their destination was often Auschwitz Death Camp. Over the course of the war, 25,257 Jews were transported (including 5,093 children) and 352 Roma over the Mechelen-Leuven railway to concentration camps. Only 1,205 returned home alive at the end of the war.

Resistance
See also Belgian Resistance and CDJ
Resistance against the German occupiers of Belgium can be seen at all levels and from all quarters of the political spectrum, but was highly fragmented. The Government in Exile dealt with resistance collectively under the name Armée Secrète, however this was just a broad name for the many resistance organisations which existed. Some organisations were very left-wing, like the Communist Front de l'Indépendance, but there was also a far-right resistance movement, the Légion Belge which comprised dissident Rexists. However, there were also other groups like Groupe G which had no obvious political affiliation.

Resistance to the occupiers chiefly came in the form of helping allied airmen escape, and numerous lines were set up to organise this, for instance the Comet line which evacuated an estimated 14,000 allied airmen to Gibraltar. Sabotage was also used, and Group G's activities alone are estimated to have cost the Nazis 20 million man-hours of labor to repair damages done. The resistance were also instrumental in saving Jews and Roma from deportation to death camps, for instance the attack on the Twentieth convoy to Auschwitz Death Camp. There was also significant low-level resistance, for instance in June 1941, the City Council of Brussels refused to distribute Stars of David badges. Many Belgians also hid Jews and political dissidents during the occupation, with one estimate putting the number at some 20,000 people.

Collaboration

See also Rexism, DeVlag, VNV and Verdinaso
During the period of Nazi occupation, some Belgians collaborated with their occupiers. There were pro-Nazi political organizations in both Flemish and Walloon communities before and during the war. The most significant were the Flemish DeVlag and Vlaamsch Nationaal Verbond (VNV)  as well as the Catholic Walloon Rexist movement. These organisations were also fundamental to encouraging Belgians to enlist into the German army. Two divisions of the Waffen SS, the Flemish 27th SS "Langemarck" Division and the Walloon 28th SS "Wallonien" Division. Some organisations, like Verdinaso appealed directly to Flemish separatist ideologies, though they did not become very popular.

After the war, many of those who had collaborated – including many of the guards at Fort Breendonk – were tried, imprisoned or shot.

Allied liberation 1944–45
Belgium was liberated late in 1944 by Allied forces, including British, Canadian, and American armies, including the Brigade Piron. On 3 September 1944 the Welsh Guards liberated Brussels. The British Second Army seized Antwerp on 4 of September 1944, and the First Canadian Army began conducting combat operations around the port that same month. Antwerp became a highly prized and heavily fought-over objective because its deep-water port was necessary to keep the allied armies supplied. The Battle of the Scheldt in October 1944 was fought primarily on Dutch soil, but with the objective of opening the way for boats to Antwerp. The port city was also the ultimate objective of German armies during the Ardennes Offensive  which resulted in heavy fighting on Belgian soil during the winter of 1944–5.

Following liberation, large numbers of Belgians who had remained in the country during the occupation were mobilised into the Belgian army in 57 "Fusilier Battalions". 100,000 Belgians were mobilised for the allies by the end of the war.

WWII to present

The "Royal Question"

Immediately after the war, Léopold III, who had surrendered himself to the German army in 1940, was released; however, the issue of whether he had betrayed his country by surrendering, while most government ministers had escaped to the United Kingdom, presented an important constitutional dilemma. In particular, the Belgian public was concerned that he might be a collaborator with the Nazis. He had met Hitler in Berchtesgaden on November 19, 1940 and had even remarried (to Lilian Baels) during the war. Many Belgians, especially the Socialists, strongly opposed his return to power. He was kept in exile in Switzerland until 1950, while his brother Prince Charles presided as regent.

A referendum was proposed in 1950 to solve the problem. However, it produced a very close result. In Flanders, the electorate voted 70% in favour ("Yes") of his return but Wallonia voted 58% against. Brussels also returned a 51% "No" vote. Although the referendum narrowly produced a favourable result for Léopold (about 57.68% in the country as a whole), the militant socialist movement in Liège, Hainaut and other urban centres incited major protests and even called a General Strike against his return.

Because of the possibility that the situation might escalate even further, Léopold III abdicated on July 16, 1951, in favour of his 20-year-old son Baudouin.

Occupation of Germany, Korean War and EDC

After the defeat of Germany in 1945, Belgian soldiers were assigned to occupy a section of West Germany, known as Belgian Forces in Germany or FBA-BSD. The last Belgian soldiers left Germany in 2002.

The European Defence Community planned in the early 1950s would have involved Belgian soldiers, as well as soldiers from Germany, France and other Benelux countries. Though the planned EDC was never actually realised, it was still responsible for a major re-organisation of the Belgian army along US Army lines. Belgium was also involved in NATO.

In 1950, a unit of volunteers from the Belgian army was sent to fight for the United Nations in the Korean War against Chinese and North Korean troops. The Belgian United Nations Command (or BUNC) arrived in Korea in early 1951, and fought at several key engagements of the conflict, including at the Battle of the Imjin River, Haktang-ni and Chatkol. BUNC was decorated and received presidential citations from both the United States and Republic of Korea. Over 300 Belgians were killed in action during the conflict. The last Belgian soldiers returned from Korea in 1955.

Benelux and Europe

See also Benelux, Nato, ECSC and EEC
On September 5, 1944, the Benelux Customs Union was created. It entered into force in 1948, and ceased to exist on 1 November 1960, when it was replaced by the Benelux Economic Union after a treaty signed in The Hague on February 3, 1958. The Benelux Parliament was created in 1955.

The Treaty of Brussels, signed on 17 March 1948 by Belgium, the Netherlands, Luxembourg, France, and the United Kingdom, is considered the precursor to the NATO agreement, which Belgium became an official member of on April 4, 1949. The headquarters of NATO are located in Brussels, and the headquarters of SHAPE near Mons.

Belgium was also one of the original founding members of the European Coal and Steel Community (ECSC) in July 1952 and of the European Economic Community formed by the Treaty of Rome on March 25, 1957.  Belgium has been a member of the Schengen area since 1985.

The Belgian "Economic Miracle"

Marshall Plan
The American Marshall Plan (officially named the  "European Recovery Program" or ERP) gave Belgium $559 million in grants from 1948 to 1951; it was not a loan and there was no repayment. A central goal of the ERP was to promote the growth of productivity along the lines of American management and labor practices. Obstacles arose which clearly limited its impact. The interest among some Belgian employers in increasing rates of productivity per worker was motivated by the rise in wage levels. But the Americans also intended to inject a new "spirit of productivity" in Belgian industries, which implied, among other measures, a reinforcement of structures of corporatist negotiation between the social partners at a local level. The ambitions of the American strategy therefore extended beyond the defined goal of introducing a Fordist type of economic system with high wages, high productivity, and low prices to consumers. After the belated establishment of the Belgian Office for the Increase of Productivity in 1952, the political character of the program became apparent. By incorporating American management principles, while at the same time decoding them and adapting them to the national situation, Belgian employers' organizations and trade unions skillfully exploited their position as intermediaries in order to appropriate the "modernist" label that they advocated. The "policy of productivity" was successful for a certain time because it matched the contours of the evolution of social reforms in Belgium. This policy success, however, was rendered impotent by the failure of the economic dimension of the productivity campaigns. The Americans had in effect failed to recognize the structural importance of the major financial groups which dominated heavy industry in Belgium. By not adopting the American notions of productivity, and more generally by not carrying out any large-scale programs of innovation and investment in the key sectors that they controlled in the aftermath of the war, these holding companies greatly restricted the scope for American influence.  Consequently, it was by other means, such as the training of managers, that the American paradigms entered into Belgian economic culture.

Growth and poverty
During the period 1945–1975, Keynesian economic theory guided politicians throughout Western Europe and this was particularly influential in Belgium. After the war, the government cancelled Belgium's debts. It was during this period that the well-known Belgian highways were built. In addition, both the economy and the average standard of living rose significantly. As noted by Robert Gildea, "Social and economic policy was designed to restore liberal capitalism tempered by social reform, as prepared for during the war. Trade unions were also involved in a price and wage policy to cut inflation and this, together with the Allied use of Antwerp as the main entry point for war supplies, produced the so-called Belgian miracle of high economic growth combined with high wages." According to one study, Belgian workers by 1961 earned wages “second only to those of the French in the Common Market area,” and earned 50% more than their Italian counterparts and 40% more than their Dutch counterparts.

Despite postwar affluence, however, many Belgians continued to live in poverty. An organisation of several poverty action groups, known as the National Action for Security of Subsistence, claimed that more than 900,000 Belgians (about 10% of the population) lived in poverty in 1967, while in the early Seventies, a group of social scientists called the Working Group on Alternative Economics estimated that about 14.5% of the Belgian population lived in poverty.

In the sphere of economics, World War II marks a turning point. Because Flanders had been widely devastated during the war and had been largely agricultural since the Belgian uprising, it benefited most from the Marshall Plan. Its standing as an economically backward agricultural region meant that it obtained support from Belgium's membership of the European Union and its predecessors. At the same time, Wallonia experienced a slow relative decline as the products of its mines and mills came to be less in demand. The economic balance between the two parts of the country has remained less in favour of Wallonia than it was before 1939.

The Second "School War" 1950–59

After victory in the 1950 elections, a Christian Social Party (PSC-CVP) government came to power in Belgium. The new education minister, Pierre Harmel increased the wages of teachers in private (Catholic) schools and introduced laws linking the subsidies for private schools to the number of pupils. These measures were perceived by the anti-clerical Liberals and Socialists as a "declaration of war".

When the 1954 elections brought to power a coalition of Socialists and Liberals, the new Education Minister, Leo Collard, immediately set out to reverse the measures taken by his predecessor, founding a large number of secular schools and only permitting teachers with a diploma, forcing many priests out of the profession. These measures sparked mass protests from the Catholic bloc. A compromise was eventually found by the next government (a Catholic minority led by Gaston Eyskens), and the "Schools War" was concluded by the November 6, 1958 "School Pact".

Congolese independence and the Congo Crisis

After riots in the Congo in 1959, the scheduled gradual transition to independence was speeded up dramatically.  In June 1960, the Belgian Congo was replaced by the short lived First Republic of Congo, led by the democratically elected and charismatic Congolese statesman Patrice Lumumba, a former political prisoner. Belgian forces withdrew, leaving the military force, the Force Publique, under Congo's control. Order broke down as mutinying soldiers attacked whites who remained in the country. Belgians forces were briefly sent in to evacuate Belgian nationals and army officers.

In July 1960, the southern state of Katanga Province declared its independence, forming the State of Katanga. Katanga's bid for sovereignty was supported by Belgian mining companies and soldiers, who had considerable assets in the area. Later that month, United Nations peacekeepers were deployed to the country. During this period of anarchy, the region of South Kasai also declared independence. Faced with the possibility that the Soviet Union would attempt to use the situation to install a sympathetic regime, western powers including Belgium, supported Joseph Mobutu who installed his own, right-wing regime in the Congo. Lumumba was murdered and civil war ensued. Belgian paratroopers were again deployed to the country, this time to rescue civilian hostages captured in Stanleyville during an operation known as Dragon Rouge.  At the end Mobutu emerged as the ruler of the re-unified country, which he named Zaire.

The General Strike of 1960–61

See also 1960–1961 Winter General Strike
In December 1960, Wallonia was gripped by a general strike in response the general decline of Wallonian manufacturing but it succeeded only in Wallonia, in a period of turbulence in the aftermath of the Second Schools War. The Wallonian workers demanded federalism, in addition to structural reforms. Even though the strike had been intended to be nationwide, Flemish workers appeared reluctant to support it.

The Strike was led by André Renard, the founder of "Renardism" which combined militant socialism with Walloon nationalism. The historian Renée Fox described Wallonia's alienation:

At the beginning of the 1960s (...), a major reversal in the relationship between Flanders and Wallonia was taking place. Flanders had entered a vigorous, post–World War II period of industrialization, and a significant percentage of the foreign capital (particularly from the United States, coming into Belgium to support new industries, was being invested in Flanders. In contrast, Wallonia's coal mines and time-worn steel plants and factories were in crisis. The region had lost thousands of jobs and much investment capital. A new Dutch-speaking, upwardly mobile "populist bourgeoisie" was not only becoming visible and vocal in Flemish movements but also in both the local and national policy...  [The strike of December 1960 against the austerity law of Gaston Eyskens ] was replaced by a collective expression of the frustrations, anxieties, and grievances that Wallonia was experiencing in response to its altered situation, and by the demands of the newly formed Walloon Popular Movement for...regional autonomy for Wallonia...

Nationwide the economy was generally healthy with an annual growth rate of 5% in the 1960s. However old inefficient factories were being shut down in textiles and leather goods. Coal miners were angered by the closure of used-up mines. Limburg miners at the Zwartberg mine rioted in 1966 to protest its closure. Two miners were killed by police and ten were injured, while nineteen policemen were hurt. In 1973 a series of worldwide crises adversely affected the Belgian economy.

The "Linguistic Wars"

This Flemish resurgence has been accompanied by a corresponding shift of political power to the Flemish, who constituted the majority of the population of around 60%. An official Dutch translation of the constitution was only accepted in 1967.

The linguistic wars reached a climax in 1968 with the splitting of the Catholic University of Leuven along linguistic lines into the Katholieke Universiteit Leuven and Université Catholique de Louvain. The government of Paul Vanden Boeynants fell over the issue in 1968.

The rise of the federal state

The successive linguistic disputes have made the successive Belgian governments very unstable. The three major parties (Liberal -right wing-, Catholic -center- and, Socialist -left wing-) all split in two according to their French- or Dutch-speaking electorate. A language border was determined by the first Gilson Act of November 8, 1962. The boundaries of certain provinces, arrondissements and municipalities were modified (among others, Mouscron became a part of Hainaut and Voeren became a part of Limburg) and facilities for linguistic minorities were introduced in 25 municipalities. On August 2, 1963, the second Gilson Act entered into force, fixing the division of Belgium into four language areas: a Dutch, a French and a German language area, with Brussels as a bilingual area.

In 1970, there was a first state reform, which resulted in the establishment of three cultural communities: the Dutch Cultural Community, the French Cultural Community and the German Cultural Community. This reform was a response to the Flemish demand for cultural autonomy. The constitutional revision of 1970 also laid the foundations for the establishment of three Regions, which was a response to the demand of the Walloons and the French-speaking inhabitants of Brussels for economic autonomy. On February 18, 1970, Prime Minister Gaston Eyskens announces the end of "La Belgique de papa".

The second state reform took place in 1980, when the cultural communities became Communities. The Communities assumed the competencies of the cultural communities with regard to cultural matters, and became responsible for the 'matters relating to the person', such as health and youth policy. From then on, these three Communities were known as the Flemish Community, the French Community and the German-speaking Community. Two Regions were established as well in 1980: the Flemish Region and the Walloon Region. However, in Flanders it was decided in 1980 to immediately merge the institutions of the Community and the Region. Although the creation of a Brussels Region was provided for in 1970, the Brussels-Capital Region was not established until the third state reform.

During the third state reform in 1988 and 1989, under Prime Minister Wilfried Martens, the Brussels-Capital Region was established with its own regional institutions, as well as Dutch and French institutions for community matters. The Brussels-Capital Region remained limited to 19 municipalities. Other changes included that the competencies of the Communities and Regions were expanded. One notable responsibility that was transferred to the Communities during the third state reform was education.

The fourth state reform, which took place in 1993 under Prime Minister Jean-Luc Dehaene, consolidated the previous state reforms and turned Belgium into a fully-fledged federal state. The first article of the Belgian Constitution was amended to read as follows, “Belgium is a Federal State which consists of Communities and Regions”. During the fourth state reform, the responsibilities of the Communities and the Regions were expanded again, their resources were increased and they were given more fiscal responsibilities. Other major changes included the direct election of the parliaments of the Communities and the Regions, the splitting up of the Province of Brabant into Flemish Brabant and Walloon Brabant, and the reformation of the Federal Parliament's bicameral system and the relations between the Federal Parliament and the Federal Government. The first direct elections for the parliaments of the Communities and the Regions took place on May 21, 1995.

However, the fourth state reform was not the end of the process of federalization. In 2001, a fifth state reform took place, under Prime Minister Guy Verhofstadt, with the Lambermont and the Lombard Accords. In the course of that reform, more powers were transferred to the Communities and the Regions, with regard to agriculture, fisheries, foreign trade, development cooperation, auditing of electoral expenses and the supplementary financing of the political parties. The Regions became responsible for twelve regional taxes, and local and provincial government became a matter for the Regions. The first municipal and provincial elections under the supervision of the Regions were the 2006 municipal elections. The functioning of the Brussels institutions was also amended during the fifth state reform, which resulted among other things in a guaranteed representation of the Flemish inhabitants of Brussels in the Parliament of the Brussels-Capital Region.

At the end of 2011, following the longest political crisis in Belgium's contemporary history, a constitutional accord between the four main political families (socialists, liberals, social-Christians, ecologists), but excluding the Flemish nationalists, ushered in the sixth state reform which provided for major institutional changes and additional transfers of competences from the federal level to the Communities and the Regions. Among other changes, the Senate ceased to be directly elected to become an assembly of regional parliaments, the Brussels-Capital Region was granted constitutive autonomy, and the Regions received economic, employment and family welfare competences as well as greater fiscal autonomy.

Belgium was one of the founders of the European Common Market. Between 1999 and 2002, the Euro gradually replaced the Belgian franc (the currency of Belgium since 1830) at the rate of 1 EUR=40.3399 BEF Belgian Euro coins usually depict King Albert II on the obverse.

Political parties
See also Political parties in Belgium
From the 1960s, most political parties, which had previously stood in elections in both Flemish and Walloon areas, split down linguistic divides. The Catholic party split in 1968 while the Belgian Socialist Party split in 1978 into the French-speaking Parti Socialiste and Flemish Socialistische Partij.  The Liberals also split on regional lines in 1992.

"Green" politics in Belgium became quite successful in the aftermath of the Marc Dutroux Scandal and the "Dioxin Affair" which led to disillusionment with the preexisting parties and the decline of the Catholic vote.

1990 to present

The Marc Dutroux scandal

In 1996, confidence in the political and criminal justice systems was shaken by the news that one Marc Dutroux and his accomplices had kidnapped, tortured, and murdered young girls. Parliamentary inquiries found the police forces were incompetent and bureaucratic, and the judicial system suffered from bureaucracy, very poor communication with, and support for, the victims, slow procedures and many loopholes for criminals.  On October 26, 1996, about 300,000 Belgians joined the "White March" in Brussels in protest.

Belgian military intervention since 1990

The United Nations mission in Rwanda during the Rwandan Civil War, known as UNAMIR, involved a significant Belgian contingent under the command of Roméo Dallaire. Belgium, as the former colonial power in the country, sent the largest force of around 400 soldiers from the 2nd Commando Battalion.

After the downing of the Rwandan and Burundian presidential plane 10 Belgian peacekeepers were kidnapped, mutilated and murdered by the Hutu-dominated government army. In response, Belgium withdrew all of its peacekeepers, blaming UNAMIR for failing to rescue their men. The Belgians had represented the largest and most capable element in the UNAMIR mission, leaving it incapacitated and unable to cope with the events of the Rwandan genocide.

Belgian paratroopers were deployed to Somalia during Operation Restore Hope as part of UNOSOM tasked with securing aid deliveries and peacekeeping. Several Belgian soldiers were killed during the deployment.

During the Kosovo crisis of 1999, 600 Belgian paratroopers participated in Operation Allied Harbour, a NATO operation to protect and provide assistance to the huge number of ethnic Albanian refugees in Albania and Macedonia. That same year, 1,100 Belgian soldiers left for Kosovo to participate in the Kosovo Force (KFOR), a NATO-led peacekeeping force.

Belgian soldiers have served in Lebanon, under the United Nations Interim Force in Lebanon (UNIFIL). Approximately 394 Belgians have served in Lebanon, in demining and medical operations, and a frigate is also present.

In the 2011, the Belgian Air Force deployed six F-16 fighter jets in support of the NATO intervention in the Libyan Civil War in accordance with United Nations Security Council Resolution 1973. Belgian aircraft were involved in airstrikes on pro-Ghadaffi forces.

Belgium is part of the ISAF mission in Afghanistan, joint with soldiers from Luxembourg. Its continent is named BELU ISAF 21, with the main objective of providing security at Kabul International Airport, while detachments (KUNDUZ 16) assist in the northern PRTs of Kunduz and Mazar-i-Sharif. In September 2008, four F‑16 jets with about 140 support personnel were deployed. They operate from Kandahar Airport. The Belgian Air Force operated close together with the Dutch F-16 fighter jets already deployed there.

Debt and economic slowdown
Belgium created huge debts during times when rates were low and generated new debts to service the initial debt. Its debts amounted to about 130% of the GDP in 1992 and were increased to about 108,2% in 2001. This drastic economic policy resulted in deep budget spending cuts, such as significant cuts to scientific research.

Internal politics
In the 1999 Belgian federal election, the traditional government parties suffered a significant defeat due to the so-called "Dioxin Affair", leading to the fall of Jean-Luc Dehaene's government after eight years in office. Guy Verhofstadt formed a government of Liberals, Socialists and Greens, forming a government without the Christian People's Party for the first time since 1958.

In July 1999, a government of Greens and Flemish Liberals and Democrats announced a gradual phase-out of Belgium's seven nuclear reactors after 40 years of operation. Though it was speculated that the next government without Greens would immediately revoke this legislation. after the 2003 elections there was still no sign of a policy reversal,  particularly in the aftermath of the incident at Tihange reactor in 2002. In 2006, the Christian-Democratic and Flemish proposed a reconsideration of the phase out.

The Belgian government was strongly opposed to the Iraq War during the Iraq crisis of 2003. The Verhofstadt government proposed a diplomatic solution regarding WMD and took the view that military action could only be taken with UN approval.

On January 30, 2003, Belgium became the second country in the world to legally recognize same-sex marriage. However, this law did not permit adoption by same-sex partners. In December 2005, a controversial proposal by the Socialist Party to permit adoption was approved by the Belgian Chamber of Representatives.

Political Crisis 2010–11

See also Belgian federal election, 2010 and 2010–2011 Belgian government formation

The 2010 Belgian federal election produced a highly fragmented political landscape, with 11 parties elected to the Chamber of Representatives, none of which had more than 20% of the seats.  The separatist New Flemish Alliance (N-VA), the largest party in Flanders and the country as a whole, controlled 27 of 150 seats in the lower chamber.  The Francophone Socialist Party (PS), the largest party in Wallonia, controlled 26 seats.  Belgium beat the world record for time taken to form a new democratic government after an election, at 353 days.  Finally a government coalition was sworn in on 6 December 2011, with Socialist Elio Di Rupo becoming Prime Minister of the Di Rupo Government.

2014–present 

The 2014 federal election (coinciding with the regional elections) resulted in a further electoral gain for the Flemish nationalist N-VA, although the incumbent coalition (composed of Flemish and French-speaking Social Democrats, Liberals, and Christian Democrats) maintains a solid majority in Parliament and in all electoral constituencies. On 22 July 2014, King Philippe nominated Charles Michel (MR) and Kris Peeters (CD&V) to lead the formation of a new federal cabinet composed of the Flemish parties N-VA, CD&V, Open Vld and the French-speaking MR, which resulted in the Michel Government. It was the first time N-VA was part of the federal cabinet, while the French-speaking side was represented only by the MR, which achieved a minority of the public votes in Wallonia.

In May 2019 federal elections in the Flemish-speaking northern region of Flanders far-right Vlaams Belang party made major gains. In the French-speaking southern area of Wallonia the Socialists were strong. The moderate Flemish nationalist party the N-VA remained the largest party in parliament. In July 2019 prime minister Charles Michel was selected to hold the post of President of the European Council. His successor Sophie Wilmès was Belgium's first female prime minister. She led the caretaker government since October 2019. The Flemish Liberal party politician Alexander De Croo became new prime minister in October 2020. The parties had agreed on federal government 16 months after the elections.

Historiography
Modern historiography of Belgium began to appear in the later 18th century, as scholars moved beyond the chronicles of particular provinces, cities or leaders and relied on rapidly accumulating data. They wrote dissertations using the critical approach to particular historical problems. This development was sponsored by The Royal Academies for Science and the Arts of Belgium and reflected Enlightenment influences—such as that of Voltaire—in exploring the history of the people. They pondered questions of causality. Their goal was building the blocks for a general history of the Austrian Netherlands, thus marking an important step toward the creation of a Belgian national history.

Since Belgium became an independent nation only in 1830, defining nationhood was a special issue for the historians of the late 19th century.  The usual European solutions which defined nationhood in terms of language would not work.  The Romantic Joseph-Jean de Smet portrayed his country as a "phoenix" (a reference to the great bird that rose from the dead.)  The challenge of defining the nation's past and present in the face of Dutch, Spanish, Austrian, French, and German influences posed a central problem.  Defending the boundaries of Belgium (especially why Flanders should not be in the Netherlands) was another issue that preoccupied historical writers such as Pirenne.

The medievalist Godefroid Kurth (1847–1916) was a student of Germany's famous professor Leopold von Ranke. Kurth introduced Ranke's advanced scholarly methods in his seminar at the Universite de Liège. Belgian historiography achieved international stature in the early 20th century with the work of medievalist Henri Pirenne (1862–1935).

Historiography at Ghent University was pioneered by medievalists, especially Hubert Van Houtte. After 1945 Charles Verlinden introduced the methods of the French Annales School of social history. Research topics at Ghent included colonial and maritime history, the history of prices and wages, agrarian history, business history, and the textile industry. In the 1970 and 1980s came a broadening to such topics as historical demography; living standards and lifestyles; beggary and crime; and the history of culture and mind-sets.

See also
 BELvue Museum – a Brussels museum tracing the history of Belgium from 1830 until the present.
 History of Flanders
 History of the Jews in Belgium
 History of Wallonia
 List of Belgian monarchs
Family tree of Belgian monarchs
 List of World Heritage Sites in Belgium
 Politics of Belgium
 Politics of Flanders
 Politics of Wallonia
 Timeline of Belgian history

Notes

References

Bibliography

Reference and surveys
 Arblaster, Paul.  A History of the Low Countries. (2006). 298 pp.
 Blom, J. C. H. and E. Lamberts, eds.  History of the Low Countries (2006) 504pp excerpt and text search
  Cammaerts, Émile. A History of Belgium from the Roman Invasion to the Present Day (1921) 357 pages;  complete text online
 Cook, Bernard A. Belgium: a history, 3rd ed. New York, 2004 
Goris, Jan-Albert, ed. Belgium (1945). 522pp; a broad survey of history and culture 
 Humes, Samuel. Belgium: Long United, Long Divided (2014) comprehensive scholarly history; 330 pp
 Israel, Jonathan. The Dutch Republic: Its Rise, Greatness, and Fall, 1477–1806 (1995) contain a great deal on Belgium; excerpt and text search
 Kossmann, E. H. The Low Countries 1780–1940 (1978) excerpt and text search; full text online in Dutch (use CHROME browser for automatic translation to English)
Kossmann-Putto, J. A. and E. H. Kossmann. The Low Countries: History of the Northern and Southern Netherlands (1987)
 Milward, Alan S. and S. B. Saul. The Development of the Economies of Continental Europe: 1850–1914 (1977) pp 142–214
 Milward, Alan S. and S. B. Saul. The Economic Development of Continental Europe 1780–1870 (2nd ed. 1979), 552pp
 Pirenne, H.  Histoire de Belgique vol2 (1903) online; full text of vol 3 (1907)online;  vol 5 (1920) online
Stallaerts, Robert. The A to Z of Belgium (2010), a historical encyclopedia

 Encyclopédie du Mouvement wallon, 3 vol., Charleroi, 2000.

Political history 
 Carlier, Julie. "Forgotten Transnational Connections and National Contexts: an 'entangled history' of the political transfers that shaped Belgian feminism, 1890–1914," Women's History Review (2010) 19#4 pp 503–522.
 Conway, Martin.  The Sorrows of Belgium: Liberation and Political Reconstruction, 1944–1947 (Oxford UP, 2012) 512 pp.  online review
 Deprez, Kas, and Louis Vos, eds. Nationalism in Belgium: Shifting Identities, 1780–1995 (1998), 21 essays by scholars
 Fishman, J. S. Diplomacy and Revolution. The London Conference of 1830 and the Belgian Revolt (Amsterdam 1988).
 Lorwin, Val R. "Belgium: Religion, class and language in national politics," in Robert Dahl, ed. Political Oppositions in Western Democracies (1966) pp 147–87.
 Mansel, Philip. "Nation Building: the Foundation of Belgium." History Today 2006 56(5): 21–27. 
 Pirenne, Henri. Early democracies in the Low Countries; urban society and political conflict in the Middle Ages and the Renaissance (1963) online
 Pirenne, Henri. Belgian Democracy Its Early History (1915) online
 Pirenne, Henri. "The Formation and Constitution of the Burgundian State (Fifteenth and Sixteenth Centuries)." The American Historical Review. 14#32 p 477+, April 1909 in JSTOR
 Polansky, Janet L. Revolution in Brussels 1787–1793 (1987)
 Strikwerda, C. J. Mass Politics and the Origin of Pluralism: Catholicism, Socialism and Flemish Nationalism in Nineteenth-Century Belgium (Lanham, MD and Leuven, 1997)
 Strikwerda, C. J. Urban Structure, Religion and Language: Belgian Workers (1880–1914) (Ann Arbor, 1986)
 VanYpersele, Laurence and Rousseaux, Xavier. "Leaving the War: Popular Violence and Judicial Repression of 'Unpatriotic' Behaviour in Belgium (1918–1921)," European Review of History 2005 12(1): 3–22.  Fulltext: Ebsco

Economic, cultural and social history
 Blomme, J. The Economic Development of Belgian Agriculture, 1880–1980 (Leuven, 1992)
 Clark, Samuel.  "Nobility, Bourgeoisie and the Industrial Revolution in Belgium,"  Past & Present (1984) # 105 pp. 140–175; in JSTOR
 Clough, Shepard B. A history of the Flemish Movement in Belgium: A study in nationalism (1930)
 de Vries, Johan. "Benelux, 1920–1970," in C. M. Cipolla, ed. The Fontana Economic History of Europe: Contemporary Economics Part One (1976) pp 1–71
 Deschouwer, Kris. "Ethnic structure, inequality and governance of the public sector in Belgium." Ethnic Inequalities and Public Sector Governance I UNRISD/Palgrave Macmillan, Basingstoke, 2006). online
 Dhondt, Jan,  and Marinette Bruwier in Carlo Cipolla, The Emergence of Industrial Societies-1 (Fontana, 1970) pp. 329–355
 Houtte, J. A. Van.  "Economic Development of Belgium and the Netherlands from the Beginning of the Modern Era," Journal of European Economic History(1972), 1:100–120
 Lijphart, Arend. Conflict and coexistence in Belgium: the dynamics of a culturally divided society (1981).
 Milward, A. S. and S. B. Saul.  The Economic Development of Continental Europe, 1780–1870 (1973), pp. 292–296, 432–453.  online; 
 Mokyr, Joel. "The Industrial Revolution in the Low Countries in the First Half of the Nineteenth Century: A Comparative Case Study," Journal of Economic History (1974) 34#2 pp 365–99 in JSTOR
 Mokyr, J. Industrialization in the Low Countries, 1795–1850 (New Haven, 1976).
 Mommens, A. The Belgian Economy in the Twentieth Century (London, 1994)
 Silverman, Debora. "'Modernité Sans Frontières:' Culture, Politics, and the Boundaries of the Avant-Garde in King Leopold's Belgium, 1885–1910." American Imago (2011) 68#4 pp 707–797. online
 Zolberg, Aristide R. "The Making of Flemings and Walloons: Belgium: 1830–1914," Journal of Interdisciplinary History (1974) 5#2 pp. 179–235 in JSTOR

Historiography and memory
 Beyen, Marnix, and Benoît Majerus. "Weak and strong nations in the Low Countries: National historiography and its 'Others' in Belgium, Luxembourg, and the Netherlands in the nineteenth and twentieth centuries." in The contested nation: ethnicity, class, religion and gender in national histories (2008): 283-310.
 Christiaens, Kim. "From the East to the South, and back? International solidarity movements in Belgium and new histories of the Cold War, 1950s–1970s." Dutch Crossing 39.3 (2015): 187-203.
 Lagrou, Pieter. "Victims of genocide and national memory: Belgium, France and the Netherlands 1945-1965." Past & present 154 (1997): 181-222. online
 Marnef, Guido. "Belgian and Dutch Post-war Historiography on the Protestant and Catholic Reformation in the Netherlands." Archiv für Reformationsgeschichte 100.1 (2009): 271-292.
 Pasture, Patrick. "Views from Abroad. Foreign Historians on a Small State by the North Sea. With Reflections on Historical Writing in Belgium and Elsewhere." Revue Belge de Philologie et d’Histoire 35 (2005): 4+ online.
 Silverman, Debora L. "Diasporas of art: history, the Tervuren Royal museum for Central Africa, and the politics of memory in Belgium, 1885–2014." Journal of Modern History 87.3 (2015): 615-667. online
 Stanard, Matthew G. "Selling the Empire Between the Wars: Colonial Expositions in Belgium, 1920–1940." French Colonial History (2005) 6: 159–178. in JSTOR
 Stanard, Matthew G. Selling the Congo: A history of European pro-empire propaganda and the making of Belgian imperialism (U of Nebraska Press, 2012)
 Stanard, Matthew G. "Belgium, the Congo, and Imperial Immobility: A Singular Empire and the Historiography of the Single Analytic Field,"French Colonial History (2014) 15 pp 87–109.

\* Tollebeek, Jo. "Historical representation and the Nation-State in romantic Belgium (1830–1850)." Journal of the History of Ideas 59.2 (1998): 329-353. online
 Tollebeek, Jo. "An Era of Grandeur. The Middle Ages in Belgian National Historiography, 1830–1914." in The Uses of the Middle Ages in Modern European States (Palgrave Macmillan, London, 2011) pp. 113–135.
 Van Den Bossche, G. M. H. "Historians as advisers to revolution? Imagining the Belgian nation." History of European ideas 24.3 (1998): 213-238.
 Van den Braembussche, Antoon. "The silence of Belgium: Taboo and trauma in Belgian memory." Yale French Studies 102 (2002): 35-52. online
 Van den Eeckhout, Patricia. "The quest for social history in Belgium (1948–1998)." Archiv für Sozialgeschichte 40 (2000): 321-336. online
 
 Verschaffel, Tom. "The modernization of historiography in 18th-century Belgium." History of European ideas 31.2 (2005): 135-146. online
 Vos, Louis. "Reconstructions of the past in Belgium and Flanders." in Secession, history and the social sciences (2002): 179-206. online 
 Warland, Geneviève, ed. Experience and memory of the first World War in Belgium: Comparative and interdisciplinary insights (Waxmann Verlag, 2019) excerpt.
 Wouters, Nico. "Historiography 1918-Today (Belgium)." International Encyclopedia of the First World War (2015): 1-11. online

External links
Belgianhistory.be
H-Net list H-Low-Countries is published free by email and is edited by scholars. Its occasional messages deal with new journal issues, methodology, archives, and teaching methods,
Historical maps of Belgium from 1340 to 1990 on WHKMLA
History of Belgium: Primary Documents
Rulers.org — Belgium List of rulers for Belgium
Overview of historical novels about The Netherland and Belgium